Jimmy Janes (July 17, 1947–September 1, 2020) was an American comics artist and storyboard artist best known for his work on DC Comics' Legion of Super-Heroes series.

Early life 
Jimmy Janes was born July 17, 1947 on Staten Island, New York and graduated from the High School of Art and Design in Manhattan.

Career
His first published work in the comics industry appeared in Greaser Comics #2 (1972), an underground comix published by Rip Off Press.  He then drew stories for Charlton Comics, Marvel Comics, and Warren Publishing over the course of the next several years. Janes began working for DC Comics in 1980 when he became the penciller of the Legion of Super-Heroes as of #263 (May 1980). He drew 15 issues of that series including "The Exaggerated Death of Ultra Boy" storyline as well as the Secrets of the Legion of Super-Heroes limited series. Janes was one of several artists to draw the comics adaptation of Xanadu in Marvel Super Special #17 (Summer 1980). After concluding his run on the Legion of Super-Heroes with issue #282 (December 1981), Janes drew a back-up story for Moon Knight #16 (February 1982) and then moved into the animation profession.

In 1988, Janes was a character designer and storyboard artist on the Teenage Mutant Ninja Turtles animated television series.  He later worked on other animated series such as Batman: The Animated Series, Exosquad, Extreme Ghostbusters, The Incredible Hulk, The Karate Kid, RoboCop: Alpha Commando, Spider-Man: The Animated Series, Swamp Thing, and X-Men: The Animated Series. 

Janes died on September 1, 2020.

Bibliography

Charlton Comics
 The Many Ghosts of Doctor Graves #36 (1973)
 Scary Tales #20 (1979)

DC Comics
 Dragonlance #14 (1989)
 Ghosts #90, 95 (covers only) (1980)
 Green Lantern #135 (cover only) (1980)
 House of Mystery #314 (1983)
 Legion of Super-Heroes vol. 2 #263–267, 269–271, 273, 275, 277–280, 282 (1980–1981)
 Secrets of Haunted House #31 (cover only) (1980)
 Secrets of the Legion of Super-Heroes #1–3 (1981)
 The Superman Family #203, 213 ("The Private Life of Clark Kent"), #212 ("Mr. & Mrs. Superman") (1980–1981)
 Time Warp #5 (1980)
 The Unexpected #201, 205–206 (covers only) (1980–1981)
 Unknown Soldier #243 (1980)
 World's Finest Comics #265 (Green Arrow) (1980)

Heroic Publishing
 Eternity Smith #1 (1987)
 The Marksman #1 (1988)

Marvel Comics
 Marvel Feature #8 (Ant-Man/Hank Pym) (1973)
 Marvel Super Special #17 (Xanadu adaptation) (1980)
 Marvel Team-Up #95 (1980)
 Moon Knight #16 (1982)

Renegade Press
 Eternity Smith #2, 5 (1986–1987)

Rip Off Press
 Greaser Comics #2 (1972)

Warren Publishing
 1984 #2–4, 7 (1978–1979)
 Eerie #46, 100, 104–105 (1973–1979)
 Rook Magazine #1 (1979)
 Vampirella #84 (1979)

References

External links 
 
 
 Jimmy Janes at Mike's Amazing World of Comics
 Jimmy Janes at the Unofficial Handbook of Marvel Comics Creators

1947 births
2020 deaths
20th-century American artists
21st-century American artists
American animators
American comics artists
American storyboard artists
Artists from New York City
DC Comics people
High School of Art and Design alumni
Marvel Comics people
People from Staten Island
Underground cartoonists